Yiannis Parmakelis (born 27 June 1932 Heraklion) is a Greek sculptor best known for his metal statues and medals.

Biography
Parmakelis completed his basic education in Heraklion, Crete and then studied at the Athens School of Fine Arts with a state scholarship. His teachers in Athens included the painter Yiannis Moralis and the sculptor Yiannis Pappas (el). During 1961-64, after winning a state scholarship foundation grant, he continued his studies at the Ecole nationale superieure des Beaux-Arts in Paris, where he studied with Ossip Zadkine and Robert Couturier.

Upon returning to Greece, he taught drawing and sculpture at the Doxiadis Technology Institute the Vakalo School of Art and Design and the Democritus University of Thrace. Parmakelis has represented Greece at many international exhibitions and Biennales. His 
work is anthropocentric, characterized by elliptical figures that combine solid structure and expressive mobility.
Examples are exhibited at museums, public spaces, private institutions and organizations in Greece, Europe and the Americas. In 2011, he was elected a member of the Academy of Athens in the section of Letters and Fine Arts.

References

External links
Parmakelis' works on public display in Heraklion

1932 births
Greek sculptors
Artists from Heraklion
20th-century Greek artists
21st-century Greek artists
20th-century sculptors
21st-century sculptors
Academic staff of the Athens School of Fine Arts
École des Beaux-Arts alumni
Living people
Members of the Academy of Athens (modern)